"Ma guitare" is a song by French singer Johnny Hallyday from the 1963 film D'où viens-tu Johnny? It was also released on a double A-side single (with the song "À plein coeur" from the same movie on the other side).

Composition and writing 
The song was written by Johnny Hallyday, Jil & Jan, and Eddie Vartan.

Commercial performance 
In France the single (listed as "Ma guitare") spent four weeks at no. 1 on the singles sales chart (in October–November 1963).

In Wallonia (French-speaking Belgium) the single charted as a double A-side and also reached number one.

Track listing 
7" single "Ma guitare / À plein coeur" B 373.205 F (1963, France)
 A. "Ma guitare" (1:50)
 AA. "À plein coeur" (2:15)

7" single "Ma guitare / Quitte-moi doucement" Philips JF 328 009 (1963, Netherlands)
 A. "Ma guitare" (1:50)
 AA. "Quitte-moi doucement" (2:15)

Charts

"Ma guitare"

"À plein coeur"

References

External links 
 Johnny Hallyday – "Ma guitare / À plein coeur" (single) at Discogs
 Johnny Hallyday – "Ma guitare / Quitte-moi doucement" (single) at Discogs

Songs about guitars
1963 songs
1963 singles
French songs
Johnny Hallyday songs
Songs written for films
Philips Records singles
Number-one singles in France
Songs written by Johnny Hallyday
Songs written by Jil & Jan
Songs written by Eddie Vartan